Neil Harlock (born 29 May 1975) is an association football player who represented New Zealand at international level.

Career
Harlock's senior career began with North Shore United and Waitakere City FC before he moved to Australia to join Wollongong City in the Australian National Soccer League

He Attended High School at Waitākere College.

Harlock represented New Zealand at under-20 and under-23, as well as the senior All Whites, making his debut in a 3–0 loss to Chile on 18 June 1995 and ended his international playing career with 9 A-international caps to his credit, his final cap an appearance in a 0–2 loss to Australia on 6 July 1997.he is now the president of Gungahlin United football club in Canberra, Australia. He is also currently the manager of the U9 Gungahlin Cosmos, who are currently undefeated in the 2021/22 season.

References

External links

1975 births
Living people
New Zealand association footballers
New Zealand international footballers
National Soccer League (Australia) players
Wollongong Wolves FC players
Association football midfielders